Tum Jo Miley was a Pakistani comedy drama which aired on Hum TV daily during Ramadan 2009 at 14:30 from 22 August 2009 to 20 September 2009.

Cast
 Fahad Mustafa as Hadi
 Sunita Marshall as Kiran Ashraf
 Asma Abbas as Naila
 Lubna Aslam as Samina
 Saba Faisal as Sadiqa
 Sami Sani as Zaman
 Hashim Butt as Shafiq
 Tipu Sharif as Jawad
 Kanwar Arsalan as Fawad
 Ayeza Khan as Shehna
 Yasir Shoro as Saim
 Badar Khalil as Amma/Nano

References

2009 Pakistani television series debuts
2009 Pakistani television series endings
Pakistani drama television series
Urdu-language television shows
Hum TV original programming